Present from You is a B-side collection by Bump of Chicken, released on June 18, 2008.

Track listing

Personnel
Fujiwara Motoo — vocals, guitar
Masukawa Hiroaki — guitar
Naoi Yoshifumi — bass
Masu Hideo — drums

References

External links
present from you at the official Bump of Chicken website.

Bump of Chicken albums
2008 compilation albums
Japanese-language compilation albums